The 2003 Giro d'Italia was the 86th edition of the Giro d'Italia, one of cycling's Grand Tours. The Giro began in Lecce, with a flat stage on 10 May, and Stage 11 occurred on 21 May with a stage to San Donà di Piave. The race finished in Milan on 1 June.

Stage 1
10 May 2003 — Lecce to Lecce,

Stage 2
11 May 2003 — Copertino to Matera,

Stage 3
12 May 2003 — Policoro to Terme Luigiane,

Stage 4
13 May 2003 — Terme Luigiane to Vibo Valentia,

Stage 5
14 May 2003 — Messina to Catania,

Rest day 1
15 May 2003

Stage 6
16 May 2003 — Maddaloni to Avezzano,

Stage 7
17 May 2003 — Avezzano to Monte Terminillo,

Stage 8
18 May 2003 — Rieti to Arezzo,

Stage 9
19 May 2003 — Arezzo to Montecatini Terme,

Stage 10
20 May 2003 — Montecatini Terme to Faenza,

Stage 11
21 May 2003 — Faenza to San Donà di Piave,

References

2003 Giro d'Italia
Giro d'Italia stages